The Way I Feel is the third studio album by Leonard Nimoy. It was released in late 1968 by Dot Records, the same year Two Sides was released.

Background
Unlike the first two albums, Nimoy stepped away from his Mr. Spock persona on this album. There are no science fiction or Spock themed songs, or outer space sound effects featured on the album. Instead, the album consists of folk songs. However, it is believed that the spoken word tracks, "Consilium" and "Where It's At" loosely tie into the Spock persona.

Track listing

Side one
 "I'd Love Making Love to You" (David Schudson)
 "Please Don't Try to Change My Mind" (Don Christopher, Leonard Nimoy)
 "Sunny" (Bobby Hebb)
 "Where It's At" (Cy Coben)
 "Both Sides Now" (Joni Mitchell)
 "If I Had a Hammer" (Pete Seeger, Lee Hays)

Side two
 "Here We Go 'Round Again" (Paul Evans, Paul Parnes)
 "Billy Don't Play the Banjo Anymore" (Randy Sparks)
 "It's Getting Better" (Barry Mann, Cynthia Weil)
 "Consilium" (Leonard Nimoy, Charles R. Grean)
 "Love Is Sweeter" (John Hartford)
 "The Hitch-Hiker" (David Somerville, Bruce Belland)

Production
Produced by Charles R. Grean and Tom Mack
Arranged by George Tipton ("Both Sides Now", "If I Had A Hammer", "Here We Go 'Round Again" and "It's Getting Better"),
Arranged by Charles R. Grean ("Where It's At", "Billy Don't Play The Banjo Anymore", "Consilium" and "The Hitch-Hiker"), Ray Pohlman ("I'd Love Making Love To You" and "Please Don't Try To Change My Mind"), and Bill Stafford ("Sunny").
Engineered by Thorne Nogar.

References

External links
Review of The Way I Feel at maidenwine.com, a detailed Leonard Nimoy fan site.

Leonard Nimoy albums
Albums produced by Charles Randolph Grean
1967 albums
Dot Records albums
Albums arranged by George Tipton